João Tito (born 19 January 1924, died before 2008) was a Portuguese sailor. He competed at the 1948 Summer Olympics and the 1952 Summer Olympics.

References

External links
 

1924 births
Year of death missing
Portuguese male sailors (sport)
Olympic sailors of Portugal
Sailors at the 1948 Summer Olympics – Firefly
Sailors at the 1952 Summer Olympics – Dragon
Place of birth missing